Barnyard Blast: Swine of the Night is a 2D shooting game on Nintendo DS developed by Thai studio Sanuk Games, and published by Bigben Interactive and Neko Entertainment in Europe, and DSI Games in America. It is a parodic tribute to famous old-school horror games from the 1980s such as Castlevania and Ghosts 'n Goblins.

Gameplay

The player controls Robert Belmart, an anthropomorphic pig, through six 2D levels:
 A Night Walk in the Graveyard
 The Ancient Castle Ruled by Darkness
 The Swamp Full of Disgusting Creepy-Crawlies
 The Volcano BBQ
 The Forest in the Way
 The Castle of Intolerable Pain

He faces diverse monsters and bosses. He is equipped with 4 weapons: a pistol, a shotgun, a slayer whip and a pack of dynamite.

Story

One Halloween night, young piglet Cliffy Belmart is caught tee-peeing an ancient castle ruled by darkness, and swept inside by horrendous creatures. Instantly aware of the peril, his father Robert Belmart equips with a fully loaded gun and rushes to rescue his son. His interlocutors along the way give him a series of wrong leads, therefore leading him to travel through 6 different worlds before finally finding his son. Dialog is packed with humor and references to famous video game quotes.

Reception

The overall reception was fair, with IGN issuing a rating of 7.2/10 and GameZone issuing a rating of 6.7/10. Reviewers praised the game's sense of humor, while its old-school gameplay drew mixed comments.

References

External links
Official Barnyard Blast website

2008 video games
Nintendo DS games
Nintendo DS-only games
Shooter video games
Nacon games
Neko Entertainment games
Destination Software games
Halloween video games
Video games about pigs
Video games developed in Thailand
Single-player video games
Sanuk Games games